{{DISPLAYTITLE:C8H10N6}}
The molecular formula C8H10O6 (molar mass: 190.20 g/mol, exact mass: 190.0967 u) may refer to:

 Dihydralazine
 4-Dimethylaminophenylpentazole

Molecular formulas